Joseph Marwa may refer to:
 Joseph Marwa (boxer)
 Joseph Marwa (actor)